Giuseppe Jarmorini (1730 - 1816) was an Italian painter, mainly of decorative painting, during the Neoclassical period.

Biography
He was active in his native Bologna. He trained under Pietro Scandellari. He was a member of Accademia Clementina.

References

1730 births
1816 deaths
Painters from Bologna
18th-century Italian painters
Italian male painters
19th-century Italian painters
19th-century Italian male artists
Italian neoclassical painters
18th-century Italian male artists